Football at the 2011 Island Games was held from 26 June–1 July 2011 at several venues.

Events

Medal table

Medal summary

References
Football at the 2011 Island Games

 
2011 Island Games
2011 in association football
2011